Provincial Road 200 (PR 200) is a provincial road in Manitoba. It runs from the Perimeter Highway (PTH 100) at Winnipeg to the border town of Emerson, ending at Manitoba Highway (PTH) 75 at Emerson, near the Canada–United States border.

Route description 
PR 200 begins as a continuation of Winnipeg Route 52 (St. Mary's Road) immediately south of the Perimeter Highway in Winnipeg and runs southward parallel to the flood plain of the meandering Red River. It passes through the community of St. Adolphe and passes by Ste. Agathe before leaving the Red River to run directly south through a heavily agricultural area to the community of Dominion City.  There it turns east, joining together with Provincial Road 201 for 1.6 kilometres (1 mile), before turning south again, towards Emerson.  At the south end of Emerson, PR 200 stops at an intersection only 3 metres from the United States border and 150 metres from the former Noyes–Emerson East Border Crossing, barricaded since 2006.  This intersection was PR 200's original junction with PTH 75 and southern terminus.  Today, PR 200 extends west from this intersection following a decommissioned section of PTH 75 (added to PR 200 in 2012) and former local service road (added to PR 200 in 2019) to its present-day junction with PTH 75 and southern terminus two kilometres (1.2 miles) north of the Pembina–Emerson Border Crossing.

History
The PR 200 designation first appeared on Manitoba's official map in 1966, the first map issued after Manitoba established the Provincial Road numbering system in 1965.  The northern part was originally known as St. Mary's Road (French: Chemin St. Mary's or, rarely, Chemin Ste. Marie), one of the Red River Trails connecting the francophone settlements along the eastern shore of the Red River with St. Boniface, the centre of Manitoba's French community.   Much of PR 200 is now paved, but sections of the road between PR 305 and PTH 23 remain a gravel road.  

St. Mary's Road is continued south of Ste. Agathe by PR 246.

References

External links 

Manitoba Official Map

Emerson, Manitoba
200